Money, Power & Respect is the debut album by hip hop group The Lox. It was released on January 13, 1998, through Bad Boy Records and featured production from the Hitmen, Dame Grease and Swizz Beatz. The album found huge success, peaking at number three on the US Billboard 200 and number one on the Top R&B/Hip-Hop Albums, and spawned two charting singles, "Money, Power & Respect" and "If You Think I'm Jiggy". In 2008, the title track was ranked number 53 on Vh1's 100 Greatest Songs of Hip Hop.

Track listing
Credits adapted from the album's liner notes.

 (co.) Co-producer

Sample credits
"If You Think I'm Jiggy" contains samples from "A Real Mutha for Ya", "Nothing Left to be Desired" by Johnny "Guitar" Watson, and interpolates "Da Ya Think I'm Sexy?" by Rod Stewart.
"Money, Power & Respect" contains a sample from "New Beginning" by Dexter Wansel
"Get This $" contains samples from "It’s Your Thing" by Lou Donaldson, "The What" by the Notorious B.I.G., and "It's Your Thing" by the Isley Brothers.
"Let's Start Rap Over" contains a sample from "Let’s Start Love Over" by Miles Jaye. Written by Michael Claxton 
"I Wanna Thank You" contains samples from "Yesterday Princess" by Stanley Clarke, "Heavenly Father" by Fu-Schnickens, and "I Want to Thank You" by Alicia Myers 
"Goin' Be Some Shit" contains samples from "Shut the Eff Up Hoe" by MC Lyte, and "Cardova" by the Meters.
"The Heist, Pt. 1" contains samples from "T.L.C." by Average White Band, and "Long Red" by Mountain.
"Bitches From Eastwick" contains samples from "Ike’s Mood I/You’ve Lost that Lovin’ Feelin’" by Isaac Hayes, and "Mean Women" by Dap Sugar Willie.
"Can't Stop, Won't Stop" contains samples from "Spoonin’ Rap" by Spoonie Gee, and "You Can't Stop the Reign" by Shaquille O'Neal.
"So Right" contains samples from "Encore" by Cheryl Lynn.

Personnel
Credits for Money, Power & Respect adapted from AllMusic.

Charles "Prince Charles" Alexander - Mixing
Deric "D-Dot" Angelettie - Audio Production, Composer, Executive Producer
Camilo Argumedes - Assistant Engineer
Carlos "6 July" Broady - Composer, Producer
Bob Brockman - Mixing
Rob Carter - Producer
Sean "Puffy" Combs - Audio Production, Composer, Executive Producer
Lane Craven - Mixing
Dame Grease - Audio Production, Keyboards, Producer
Stephen Dent - Engineer, Mixing
DMX - Additional Personnel, Featured Artist, Guest Artist, Rap
John Eaton - Engineer
Jay Garfield - Producer
Rasheed Goodlowe - Engineer
Terri Haskins - Art Direction
Daniel Hastings - Photography
Cheryl Jacobsen - Group Member
Jadakiss - Member of Attributed Artist, Rap
Steve Jones - Assistant Engineer, Engineer
S. Jordan - Composer
Ron Lawrence - Producer
Jimmie Lee - Engineer
Lil' Kim - Additional Personnel, Featured Artist, Guest Artist, Rap
The Lox - Primary Artist, Producer
Gregg Mann - Engineer
Tony Maserati -	Engineer, Mixing
Damaris Mercado - Design
John Meredith -	Engineer, Unknown Contributor Role
Lynn Montrose - Assistant Engineer
Nasheim Myrick - Audio Production, Composer, Producer
Michael Patterson - Engineer, Mixing
Pent P.K. - Producer
Jayson Phillips - Composer, Group Member
Herb Powers - Mastering
Kelly Price - Additional Personnel, Featured Artist, Guest Artist, Vocals
Puff Daddy - Additional Personnel, Featured Artist, Guest Artist, Rap
Sheek Louch - Member of Attributed Artist, Rap
Styles P - Member of Attributed Artist, Rap
David Styles -Composer, Group Member
Swizz Beatz - Audio Production
Carl Thomas - Additional Personnel, Featured Artist, Guest Artist, Rap
Chucky Thompson - Producer, Vocals (Background)
Barry White - Grooming
Rob Williams - Engineer
Doug Wilson - Engineer
Young Lord - Producer 
Micheal Claxton - Writer  "Let's Start Rap Over"

Charts

Weekly charts

Year-end charts

Certifications

See also
List of number-one R&B albums of 1998 (U.S.)

References 

D-Block Records albums
1998 debut albums
Bad Boy Records albums
Albums produced by Sean Combs
Albums produced by Dame Grease
Albums produced by Swizz Beatz
The Lox albums